Ascidiogyne is a genus of flowering plants in the family Asteraceae.

 Species
Both species are endemic to northeastern Peru
 Ascidiogyne sanchezvegae Cabrera - Peru (Amazonas and Cajamarca regions)
 Ascidiogyne wurdackii Cuatrec. - Peru (Amazonas Region)

References

Asteraceae genera
Eupatorieae
Endemic flora of Peru